Linda Clifford (born 1948) is an American R&B, disco and house music singer who scored hits from the 1970s to the 1980s, most notably "If My Friends Could See Me Now", "Bridge over Troubled Water", "Runaway Love" and "Red Light".

Career 
Clifford is a former Miss New York State, and fronted a jazz music trio before switching to R&B. After winning her title, Clifford worked as an actress, playing minor roles in films such as The Boston Strangler with Tony Curtis and Henry Fonda, Coogan's Bluff with Clint Eastwood and Sweet Charity with Shirley MacLaine. Unsatisfied with her roles, Clifford decided to concentrate on her singing career, performing for a year in Miami-area night clubs with the Jericho Jazz Singers, before forming her own group Linda & the Trade Winds.

In 1973, she was signed to Paramount Records and her first single, "(It's Gonna Be) A Long Long Winter", was a minor hit on the U.S. Billboard R&B chart in the winter of 1974. She moved to Curtis Mayfield's Curtom Records label in the mid 1970s. In 1977 she released her first album, Linda, and in 1978, her dance cover of "If My Friends Could See Me Now" was a hit in clubs and on the Billboard Hot 100. It was her first number one on Billboard dance chart. Her album of the same name became her most successful and included also "Runaway Love", a mid-tempo R&B track that proved to be one of her most recognizable tunes. In 1979, she released her disco version of "Bridge over Troubled Water" from the album Let Me Be Your Woman.

In 1980, she released a duet album with Curtis Mayfield, The Right Combination, and recorded a song "Red Light" for the Fame soundtrack in 1980. It peaked at number one on the American dance chart. "Shoot Your Best Shot" (1980) and "Don't Come Crying to Me" (1982) were the third and fourth of her four number one dance hits in the US. She released six albums while under contract on the Curtom label, all supervised by Curtis Mayfield, generally produced by Gil Askey (jazz trumpet player and musical director for many Motown acts) with many mixes by Jim Burgess or Jimmy Simpson, brother of Valerie Simpson from Ashford and Simpson. The sixth, I'm Yours, was produced by Isaac Hayes with the exception of "Red Light" (written by Pitchford and Gore). Curtom Records was distributed by Warner Bros. (1977–1978), by RSO (1979–1980) and by the end of 1980 by Capitol.

Her contract switched entirely to Capitol for her seventh album, I'll Keep on Loving You (1982). It included collaboration by Luther Vandross and the original version of "All the Man That I Need", another song written by Pitchford and Gore; they wrote this particular song with Clifford and her husband in mind. A year later it was covered by Sister Sledge, in 1990 by Whitney Houston and in 1994 by Luther Vandross, under the name "All the Woman That I Need". On his album Songs, Vandross even credited Houston for being the "artist who did the original version of the song", forgetting that it was originally Clifford's song and that he was a background vocalist and the vocal arranger of her version.

Her 1984 offering, Sneakin' Out did relatively well on the American R&B chart. Clifford's last studio album to date remains 1985's My Heart's on Fire, supported by the single "The Heat in Me". In 2001, she secured her fourth UK Singles Chart entry with "Ride the Storm", billed as Akabu featuring Linda Clifford. Her most recent single, "Baby I'm Yours", was released in 2011.

In 2012, her minor hit from 1979, "I Just Wanna Wanna", resurfaced as the love theme in the Lee Daniels film, The Paperboy.

In 2015, Clifford collaborated with disco and house vocalists Martha Wash and Evelyn "Champagne" King on the download-only single "Show Some Love", which reached number #6 on the Billboard Dance Charts the same year, and released on Martha Wash's own label Purple Rose Records. Their collaboration was credited as a group to "First Ladies of Disco". A video was released to promote the single  along with an alternate video featuring a remix by John LePage and Brian Cua.

Discography

Studio albums

Compilation albums 
Greatest Hits (1989, Curtom)
Runaway Love and Other Hits (1999, Rhino)
Runaway Love: The Curtom Anthology (2000, Sequel)

Singles

See also 
List of number-one dance hits (United States)
List of artists who reached number one on the US Dance chart

References

External links 

 Official website

 Linda Clifford on Discogs
 Linda Clifford on Rate Your Music

1944 births
Living people
American rhythm and blues singers
American dance musicians
American disco musicians
American house musicians
American women singers
Musicians from Brooklyn
RSO Records artists
American women in electronic music
21st-century American women